This is a list of awards and nominations received by the late American R&B singer Aaliyah. Her accolades include three American Music Awards and two MTV VMAs, along with five Grammy Award nominations.

American Music Awards

|-
|1995
|Aaliyah
|Favorite Soul/R&B New Artist
|
|-
|1999
|Aaliyah
|Favorite Soul/R&B Female Artist
|
|-
|rowspan="2"|2002
|Aaliyah
|Favorite Soul/R&B Female Artist
|
|-
|Aaliyah
|Favorite Soul/R&B Album
|
|-
|2003 (November)
|Aaliyah
|Favorite Soul/R&B Female Artist
|
|}

BET Awards

|-
|rowspan="2"|2001
|"Romeo Must Die"
|Best Actress
|
|-
|Aaliyah
|Best Female R&B Artist
|
|-
|rowspan="4"|2002
|"Queen of the Damned"
|Best Actress
|
|-
|Aaliyah
|Best Female R&B Artist
|
|-
|rowspan="2"|"Rock the Boat"
|Video of the Year
|
|-
|Viewer's Choice
|
|}

Billboard Music Awards

|-
|rowspan="3"|1994
|rowspan="3"|Aaliyah
|Top Pop Female Artist of the Year
|
|-
|Top New R&B Artist of the Year
|
|-
|Top R&B Female Singles Artist of the Year
|
|-
|2000
|Aaliyah
|Female R&B/Hip-Hop Artist of the Year
|
|-
|rowspan="2"|2002
|rowspan="2"|Aaliyah
|Female R&B/Hip-Hop Artist of the Year
|
|-
|Top R&B/Hip-Hop Songs of the Year
|
|-
|rowspan="2"|2003
|rowspan="2"|Aaliyah
|R&B/Hip-Hop Artist of the Year
|
|-
|Hot 100 Female Artist of the Year
|
|}

Billboard Music Video Awards

|-
|1994
|"Back & Forth"
|Best New R&B/Urban Artist Clip Of The Year
|
|-
|rowspan="2"|2000
|rowspan="2"|"Try Again"
|Maximum Vision Video
|
|-
|Best R&B Clip
|
|}

Billboard R&B/Hip-Hop Awards

|-
|rowspan="5"|2002
|rowspan="3"|Aaliyah
|Top R&B/Hip-Hop Artist
|
|-
|Top R&B/Hip-Hop Artist, Female
|
|-
|Top R&B/Hip-Hop Singles Artist
|
|-
|rowspan="2"|"Rock The Boat"
|Top R&B/Hip-Hop Single
|
|-
|Top R&B/Hip-Hop Single - Airplay
|
|-
|rowspan="4"|2003
|rowspan="3"|Aaliyah
|Top R&B/Hip-Hop Artist
|
|-
|Top R&B/Hip-Hop Artist, Female
|
|-
|Top R&B/Hip-Hop Singles Artist
|
|-
|"Miss You"
|Top R&B/Hip-Hop Single - Airplay
|
|}

Blockbuster Entertainment Awards

|-
|1997
|"One In A Million"
|Favorite Female Artist - R&B
|
|}

Echo

|-
|2003
|Aaliyah
|Best Hip-Hop/R&B International
|
|-
|}

Fangoria Chainsaw Awards

|-
|2003
|"Queen of the Damned"
|Best Actress
|
|}

Grammy Awards

|-
|1999
|"Are You That Somebody?"
|Best Female R&B Vocal Performance
|
|-
|2001
|"Try Again"
|Best Female R&B Vocal Performance
|
|-
|rowspan="2"|2002
|Aaliyah
|Best R&B Album
|
|-
|"Rock the Boat"
|Best Female R&B Vocal Performance
|
|-
|2003
|"More Than a Woman"
|Best Female R&B Vocal Performance
|
|}

MOBO Awards

|-
|2002
|"More Than a Woman"
|Best Video
|
|}

MTV Europe Music Awards

|-
|2000
|Aaliyah
|Best R&B
|
|}

MTV Movie Awards

|-
|1999
|"Are You That Somebody?"
|Best Song from a Movie
|
|-
|rowspan="2"|2001
|rowspan="2"|"Romeo Must Die"
|Best Female Performance
|
|-
|Best Breakthrough Female Performance
|
|-
|2002
|"Queen of the Damned"
|Best Villain
|
|}

MTV Video Music Awards

|-
|rowspan="2"|1999
|rowspan="2"|"Are You That Somebody?"
|Best R&B Video
|
|-
|Best Video from a Film
|
|-
|rowspan="3"|2000
|rowspan="3"|"Try Again"
|Best Female Video
|
|-
|Best Video From a Film
|
|-
|Best Choreography
|
|-
|2002
|"Rock the Boat"
|Best R&B Video
|
|-
|2003
|"Miss You"
|Best R&B Video
|
|}

My VH1 Music Awards

|-
|2000
|Aaliyah
|Double Threat (Musician/Actors) 
|
|-
|2001
|Aaliyah
|My Favorite Female
| 
|}

NAACP Image Awards

|-
|1999
|"Are You That Somebody?"
|Outstanding Music Video
|
|-
|2001
|"Try Again"
|Outstanding Music Video
|
|-
|rowspan="3"|2002
|Aaliyah
|Outstanding Album
|
|-
|Aaliyah
|Outstanding Female Artist
|
|-
|"Rock The Boat"
|Outstanding Music Video
|
|}

Nickelodeon Kids Choice Awards

|-
|rowspan="2"|1999
|"Are You That Somebody?"
|Favorite Song
|
|-
|Aaliyah
|Favorite Singer
|
|}

NME Awards

|-
|2002
|Aaliyah
|Best R&B/ Soul Act
|
|}

Prestige Awards

|-
|2002
|Aaliyah
|Entertainer of the Year
|
|}

Soul Train Music Awards

|-
|rowspan="2"|1995
|Aaliyah
|Best R&B/Soul or Rap New Artist
|
|-
|Age Ain't Nothing but a Number
|Best R&B/Soul Album, Female
|
|-
|1997
|One in a Million
|Best R&B/Soul Album, Female
|
|-
|1998
|"One in a Million"
|Best R&B/Soul Single, Female
|

|-
|rowspan="3"|2002
|rowspan="2"|Aaliyah
|Best R&B/Soul Album, Female
|
|-
|Best R&B/Soul or Rap Album of the Year
|
|-
|"Rock the Boat"
|Best R&B/Soul Single, Female
|
|}

Soul Train Lady of Soul Awards

|-
|1995
|"Back & Forth"
|Best R&B/Soul New Artist
|
|-
|rowspan="2"|1999
|rowspan="2"|"Are You That Somebody?"
|Best R&B/Soul Song
|
|-
|Best R&B/Soul or Rap Music Video
|
|-
|rowspan="2"|2000
|rowspan="3"|"Try Again"
|Best R&B/Soul Single - Solo
|
|-
|Best R&B/Soul or Rap Music Video
|
|-
|2001
|Best R&B/Soul or Rap Song of the Year
|
|-
|rowspan="4"|2002
|Aaliyah
|Best R&B/Soul Album of the Year
|
|-
|rowspan="3"|"Rock the Boat"
|Best R&B/Soul Single
|
|-
|Best R&B/Soul or Rap Song of the Year
|
|-
|Best R&B/Soul or Rap Music Video
|
|}

Source Awards

|-
|2003
|Aaliyah
|R&B Artist of the Year, Female
|
|}

Teen Choice Awards

|-
|2000
|"Try Again"
|Choice Summer Song
| 
|-
|rowspan="2"|2001
|rowspan="2"|Aaliyah
|Choice Music: Female Artist
|
|-
|Choice Female Hottie
|
|-
|2002
|"More Than A Woman"
|Choice Music: R&B/Hip-Hop Track
|
|}

World Music Awards

|-
|2001
|Aaliyah
|World's Best Selling R&B Artist
|
|-
|}

References

Aaliyah
Awards